Karl Adolf Clark (20 October 1888, Georgetown, Ontario – 7 December 1966, Victoria, British Columbia) was a chemist and oil sand researcher.  He is best known for perfecting a process that uses hot water and reagents to separate bitumen from oil sands.

Biography

Clark earned bachelor's and master's degrees from McMaster University before obtaining a Doctorate in Chemistry from the University of Illinois. He began work at the Geological Survey of Canada in 1915, where he became interested in oil sands. 

In 1920 he moved to Edmonton and joined the University of Alberta and the Scientific and Industrial Research Council of Alberta (SIRCA), where he began experimenting with separating bitumen from the Athabasca oil sands, a large oil sand deposit in northeastern Alberta.

Clark built a prototype separation plant in the basement of the university's power plant, followed by a larger plant on the outskirts of Edmonton. In 1929, SIRCA patented the process that he had developed. Later testing was done on the outskirts of Fort McMurray near Waterways, and farther north at Bitumount.

Clark retired from the Department of Mining Engineering at the University of Alberta in 1954 but continued to provided advice to the developing oil sands industry. In 1958 he signed a formal retainer with the Great Canadian Oil Sands consortium, which eventually became a major asset for Suncor. He continued to do research at SIRCA its succeeding organization, the Research Council of Alberta, until 1963. 

He died of cancer on December 7, 1966, in Victoria, British Columbia.

References

External links
 Biography at Alberta's Petroleum Heritage Edukit.

Athabasca oil sands
History of Alberta
1888 births
1966 deaths
Canadian chemists
McMaster University alumni
University of Illinois Urbana-Champaign alumni